James Morton may refer to:

Politics and law
 James Morton (Canadian businessman) (1808–1864), Irish-Canadian brewer, manufacturer and politician
 James Madison Morton Sr. (1837–1923), American jurist, justice of the Massachusetts Supreme Judicial Court
 James Madison Morton Jr. (1869–1940), American federal judge
 Jim Morton (politician) (born 1951), Canadian politician
 James Cooper Morton (born 1960), Canadian lawyer and author

Sports
 James Morton (footballer, born 1885) (1885–1926), Scottish footballer
 Jimmy Morton (1894–1916), Scottish footballer
 Jim Morton (Australian footballer) (1905–1999), Australian rules footballer
 Jim Morton (footballer, born 1956), Scottish footballer
 James Morton (footballer, born 1999), English footballer

Others
 James St. Clair Morton (1824–1864), Union Army general during the American Civil War
 Sir James Morton (chemist) (1867–1943), Scottish chemist, creator of light-fast dyes
 James Ferdinand Morton Jr. (1870–1941), American political activist
 James C. Morton (1884–1942), American actor
 James Parks Morton (1930–2020), American Episcopal priest, founder of the Interfaith Center of New York
 James Morton (baker) (born 1991), Scottish celebrity baker
 James Morton (physician) (fl. 2000s–present), Australian physician and autism advocate

See also
 James Douglas, 1st Earl of Morton (1426–1493), 4th Lord of Dalkeith, was created the 1st Earl of Morton in 1458
 James Douglas, 3rd Earl of Morton (died 1548), grandson of the above
 James Douglas, 4th Earl of Morton (c. 1525–1581), regent of Scotland
 James Douglas, 14th Earl of Morton (1702–1768), president of the Royal Society